Resumption may refer to:

 Eminent domain
 The Specie Payment Resumption Act of 1875